The Svilengrad railway station is the last station before the Bulgaria/Turkey and Bulgaria/Greece border. The station was built in 1874 by the Chemins de fer Orientaux as part of the İstanbul-Vienna Railway. Regional trains to Dimitrovgrad as well as the Bosphorus Express to Bucharest and the Balkans Express to Belgrade via Sofia, both from İstanbul service the station.

Railway stations in Bulgaria
Buildings and structures in Haskovo Province